Breckenridge is a locational Scottish surname, referring to a person from a place named Breckenridge, and other phonetic spellings, e.g. Breckonridge, Breakenridge, Brackenridge, et al. Such names as the aforementioned are anglicizations of the Scottish place name "Brackenrig". There are several villages in Scotland named "Brackenrig", including in Lanarkshire, Ayrshire, Glasgow, and others. "Brackenrig" referred to plowed fields with ridges and ferns, prolific in this area.  The prefix derives from braken (northern Middle English, meaning "bracken", itself derived from the Old Norse brækni). The suffix derives from rigg (meaning "ridge", from the Old Norse hryggr). Early spellings had several variations including Brecenrigg, Brecenrig, Breckinrigg, Breconrig, Breconnrigg; and these evolved to Brackenridge, Breakenridge, Breakinridge, Breckenridge, Breccinridge, Breckenridge, and others. As people moved, the surname spread to England and Ireland, becoming a common English and Irish surname as well. At the time of the British Census of 1881, the frequency of the surname Breckenridge was highest in Ayrshire (66.2 times the British average), followed by Haddingtonshire, Lanarkshire, Renfrewshire, Stirlingshire, Pembrokeshire, Argyll, Kirkcudbrightshire, Edinburghshire and Dunbartonshire.  People with the surname include:

 Alexandra Breckenridge (born 1982), American film and television actress
 Beverly Breckenridge (b.?), Canadian musician
 Donald Breckenridge (1932–2005), American hotel chain founder and president
 Eddie Breckenridge (born 1979), American bassist with Thrice; younger brother of Riley Breckenridge
 Hugh Henry Breckenridge (1870–1937), American painter
 Jody A. Breckenridge (b.?), American Coast Guard Rear Admiral
 John C. Breckinridge (1821–1875), Vice President of the United States, Confederate Army general
 Laura Breckenridge (born 1983), American actress
 Lisa Breckenridge (born 1965), American TV reporter
 Michael Breckenridge (b.?), American actor, musician, humorist and artist
 Patricia Breckenridge (born 1953), American Judge on the Supreme Court of Missouri
 Riley Breckenridge (born 1975), American drummer with Thrice; older brother of Eddie Breckenridge
 Thomas Breckenridge (1865–?), Scottish footballer

See also
 Breakenridge (disambiguation)
 Breckinridge (disambiguation)

References

English-language surnames
Surnames of Lowland Scottish origin